The Football NSW 2019 season was the seventh season of football in New South Wales under the banner of the National Premier Leagues. The competition consists of four divisions across the state of New South Wales.

Wollongong Wolves, as the Premiers of the NPL NSW Men's 1, qualified for the national finals, where they became the champion of the 2019 National Premier Leagues, and in doing so received an automatic spot in the 2020 FFA Cup.

Due to  a restructure of Men's and Boys' competitions for the 2020 season, this was the last season that the Club Championship determined the teams for promotion and relegation.

Competitions

2019 National Premier League NSW Men's 1

Clubs

Coaching changes

League table

Results

Finals

Elimination final/Qualifying final

Major/Minor semi-finals

Preliminary final

Grand final

Top scorers

2019 National Premier League NSW Men's 2

For the 2019 NPL NSW season 3 teams were relegated due to a change in the competition format for 2020.

League Table

Finals

2019 National Premier League NSW Men's 3

For the 2019 NPL NSW season 5 teams were relegated due to a change in the competition format for 2020, and the introduction of the new NPL4 division.

League Table

Finals

2019 NSW State League

The competition was restructured at the end of the season, with the introduction of the new NPL4 division for 2020.

League Table

Finals

2019 National Premier Leagues NSW Women's 1

The 2019 National Premier Leagues NSW Women's 1 was the sixth edition of the NPL NSW Women's competition to be incorporated under the National Premier Leagues banner. 12 teams competed, playing each other twice for a total of 22 rounds.

League Table

Finals

2019 Waratah Cup

Football NSW soccer clubs competed in 2019 for the Waratah Cup. The tournament doubled as the NSW qualifier for the 2019 FFA Cup, with the top five clubs progressing to the Round of 32. A total of 144 clubs entered the qualifying phase, with the clubs entering in a staggered format.

The Cup was won by Marconi Stallions, their 2nd title.

In addition to the three A-League clubs (Central Coast Mariners, Sydney FC and Western Sydney Wanderers), the five qualifiers (Manly United, Marconi Stallions, Mt Druitt Town Rangers, Sydney United 58 and St George FC) competed in the final rounds of the 2019 FFA Cup.

References

2019 in Australian soccer